Pseudexomilus caelatus is an extinct species of sea snail, a marine gastropod mollusk in the family Horaiclavidae.

Description
The length of the shell attains 11.6 mm, its diameter 3.9 mm.

Distribution
This extinct marine species is endemic to Australia and occurs in Lower Pliocene strata off Adelaide, Australia.

References

External links

caelatus
Gastropods described in 1944
Gastropods of Australia